Nathan T. Wang (born Wang Tsung-Hsien, born August 8, 1956 in Los Angeles, California, USA) is a Chinese-born American music composer and director. He graduated from Pomona College in California and received an Ambassadorial Scholarship from Rotary International to study at Oxford University. He is the winner of the Cable Ace award for the soundtrack to the documentary The Lost Children of Berlin. He also composed the acclaimed soundtrack for the aviation film, One Six Right.

Nathan Wang is a Master of Movie Music with Beijing DeTao Masters Academy (DTMA), a high-level, multi-disciplined, application-oriented higher education institution in Shanghai, China.

Early life
Wang was born in Los Angeles, California, to parents from Shanghai, China. He began playing the piano at age three. He attended Pomona College, graduating in 1979.

Career
Wang is an associate professor of film scoring at Peking University.

Composer
 Far East Deep South (2020)
 Playing With Fire (2019)
 Wished (2017)
 The Healer (2017)
 Detective Chinatown (2015)
 The Patriot Yue Fei (2015)
 Brotherhood of Blades (film) (2014)
 Farmland (film) (2014)
 Sleeping Dogs (2012) (Multi platform game)
 Inseparable (2011)
 You Again (2010)
 Sophie's Revenge (2009)
 The Legend of Pancho Barnes and the Happy Bottom Riding Club (2009)
 How to Make Love to a Woman (2009)
 Van Wilder: Freshman Year (2009)
 War Dogs of the Pacific (2009)
 Hatching Pete (2009) (TV)
 Inspire Me: Weightless Flights of Discovery (2009)
 It's All About the Benjamins (2009)
 The Age of Believing: The Disney Live Action Classics (2008) (TV) (original music by)
 Valentine (12 episodes, 2008)
 "God Only Knows" (2008) TV episode
 "She's Gone" (2008) TV episode
 "The Book of Love" (2008) TV episode
 "Act Naturally" (2008) TV episode
 "Daddy's Home" (2008) TV episode
 Nuptials of the Dead (2008) (original music by)
 Jack N Jill (2008)
 Minutemen (2008) (TV)
 Labou (2008) (V)
 The Final Season (2007)
 The Game Plan (2007)
 Johnny Kapahala: Back on Board (2007) (TV)
 Tina Bobina (2007)
 Flight of the Living Dead: Outbreak on a Plane (2007) (V)
 ... a.k.a. Flight of the Living Dead (USA: new title)
 Highlander: The Search for Vengeance (2007) (V)
 Everest E.R. (2006)
 Wendy Wu: Homecoming Warrior (2006) (TV)
 The World According to Sesame Street (2006)
 Ten Days That Unexpectedly Changed America: Massacre at Mystic (2006) (TV)
 She's the Man (2006)
 ... a.k.a. L'homme c'est elle (Canada: French title)
 Tom and Jerry: The Fast and the Furry (2005) (V)
 Enter the Dragonfly (2005)
 San wa (2005)
 ... a.k.a. Shen hua (Hong Kong: Mandarin title)
 ... a.k.a. The Myth (International: English title)
 A Really Big Problem (2005)
 One Six Right (2005)
 Come as You Are (2005)
 "The American Experience" (1 episode, 2005)
 The Great Transatlantic Cable (2005) TV episode
 Reefer Madness: The Movie Musical (2005)
 ... a.k.a. Kifferwahn (Germany)
 Perceptions (2005) (co-composer)
 ... a.k.a. Dangerous Perceptions (USA: new title)
 The Four Chaplains: Sacrifice at Sea (2004) (TV)
 A Remarkable Promise (2004)
 Voices from the List (2004) (V)
 Burma Bridge Busters (2003) (TV)
 Charlie's War (2003)
 Red Trousers: The Life of the Hong Kong Stuntmen (2003)
 ... a.k.a. Hong ku zi (Hong Kong: Mandarin title)
 ... a.k.a. Hung fu zi (Hong Kong: Cantonese title)
 Who's Your Daddy? (2003/I) (V)
 Price for Peace (2002)
 The Black Magic (2002)
 A Salute to Robert Altman, an American Maverick (2002) (TV)
 "American Family" (2002) TV series (unknown episodes)
 ... a.k.a. "American Family: Journey of Dreams" (USA: second season title)
 Vacuums (2002)
 ... a.k.a. Stealing Bess (USA: video title)
 Shoot! (2001)
 Nine Dog Christmas (2001) (V)
 Forbidden City (2001)
 Leui ting jin ging (2000)
 ... a.k.a. China Strike Force (Hong Kong: English title) (USA)
 ... a.k.a. Lei ting zhan jing (Hong Kong: Mandarin title)
 "That's Life" (2 episodes, 2000)
 The Screw-Up (2000) TV episode
 Pilot (2000) TV episode
 Rock, Paper, Scissors (2000)
 Grandma Got Run Over by a Reindeer (2000) (TV)
 Brightness (2000)
 NetAid (1999) (TV)
 "Sabrina the Animated Series" (1999) TV series (unknown episodes)
 ... a.k.a. "Sabrina" (USA: short title)
 The Brothers Flub (1999) (TV)
 Storm (1999) (V)
 ... a.k.a. Storm Trackers
 Dak ging san yan lui (1999)
 ... a.k.a. Gen-X Cops (Hong Kong: English title) (International: English title: literal title)
 ... a.k.a. Te jing xin ren lei (Hong Kong: Mandarin title)
 Clowns (1999)
 The Water Ghost (1998)
 Wo shi shei (1998)
 ... a.k.a. Jackie Chan's Who Am I? (USA: cable TV title)
 ... a.k.a. Who Am I?
 "Fat Dog Mendoza" (1998) TV series
 Moses: Egypt's Great Prince (1998) (V)
 "Toonsylvania" (1998) TV series (unknown episodes)
 ... a.k.a. "Steven Spielberg Presents Toonsylvania"
 The Secret of Mulan (1998) (V)
 The Magic Pearl (1997)
 The Lost Children of Berlin (1997)
 The Secret of Anastasia (1997) (V)
 Muppet Treasure Island (1996) (VG)
 "Bruno the Kid" (1996) TV series (unknown episodes)
 "Tales from the Crypt" (1 episode, 1996)
 ... a.k.a. "HBO's Tales from the Crypt"
 The Third Pig (1996) TV episode
 Ging chaat goo si 4: Ji gaan daan yam mo (1996)
 ... a.k.a. Jackie Chan's First Strike (USA)
 ... a.k.a. Jing cha gu shi 4: Zhi jian dan ren wu (Hong Kong: Mandarin title)
 ... a.k.a. Police Story 4: First Strike (Hong Kong: English title)
 Bruno the Kid: The Animated Movie (1996) (V)
 Siegfried & Roy: Masters of the Impossible (1996) (V)
 "The Twisted Adventures of Felix the Cat" (1995) TV series
 ... a.k.a. "The Twisted Tales of Felix the Cat" (USA: cable TV title)
 Hung fan au (1995)
 ... a.k.a. Rumble in the Bronx (Hong Kong: English title) (USA)
 ... a.k.a. Hong fan ou (Hong Kong: Mandarin title)
 ... a.k.a. Red Bronx
 ... a.k.a. Zizanie dans le Bronx (Canada: French title)
 Natural Causes (1994)
 Black Belt Angels (1994)
 "The Shnookums and Meat Funny Cartoon Show" (1993) TV series (unknown episodes)
 Nick and Noel (1993) (TV)
 Animated Classic Showcase (1993) (TV)
 Return to Zork (1993) (VG)
 "Eek! the Cat" (1992) TV series (unknown episodes)
 ... a.k.a. "Eek! and the Terrible Thunderlizards"
 ... a.k.a. "Eek!stravaganza"
 "Bill & Ted's Excellent Adventures" (1992) TV series (unknown episodes)
 Spellcaster (1992)
 The Kiss (1992)
 "China Beach" (2 episodes, 1990)
 A Rumor of Peace (1990) TV episode
 Holly's Choice (1990) TV episode
 "Encyclopedia Brown" (1989) TV series (unknown episodes)
 Screwball Hotel (1988)

Music department
2000s
1990s
1980s
 One Six Right (2005) (orchestrator)
 Sabrina: The Animated Series (composer: additional music) (22 episodes, 1999)
 ... a.k.a. "Sabrina" (USA: short title)
 "Anywhere But Here" (1999) TV episode (composer: additional music)
 Boogie Shoes (1999) TV episode (composer: additional music)
 Boy Meets Bike (1999) TV episode (composer: additional music)
 Extreme Harvey (1999) TV episode (composer: additional music)
 Feats of Clay (1999) TV episode (composer: additional music)
 The Last Days (1998) (associate composer) (orchestrator)
 Flesh Gordon Meets the Cosmic Cheerleaders (1989) (composer: additional music)
 ... a.k.a. Flesh Gordon 2
 Soundtrack:
 Wo shi shei (1998) (writer: "Friendship")
 ... a.k.a. Jackie Chan's Who Am I? (USA: cable TV title)
 ... a.k.a. Who Am I?
 Hung fan au (1995) (writer: "You Are The One")
 ... a.k.a. Rumble in the Bronx (Hong Kong: English title) (USA)
 ... a.k.a. Hong fan ou (Hong Kong: Mandarin title)
 ... a.k.a. Red Bronx
 ... a.k.a. Zizanie dans le Bronx (Canada: French title)
 Actor:
 Who's Your Daddy? (2003/I) (V) .... The Arnold Horshack Experience

References

External links 
 

1956 births
Living people
21st-century American composers
21st-century American male musicians
Alumni of the University of Oxford
American film score composers
American male film score composers
American musicians of Chinese descent
American television composers
Musicians from Los Angeles
Academic staff of Peking University
Pomona College alumni
Fulbright alumni